The Zygomaturinae are an extinct subfamily of marsupials. The phylogeny and taxonomy of this clade is poorly understood and problematic. Zygomaturines are currently thought to be a subfamily within Diprotodontidae, rather than a distinct family.

References
 Prehistoric Mammals of Australia and New Guinea: One Hundred Million Years of Evolution by John A. Long, Michael Archer, Timothy Flannery, and Suzanne Hand  (page 91)

Prehistoric vombatiforms
Chattian first appearances